Zoukougbeu Department is a department of Haut-Sassandra Region in Sassandra-Marahoué District, Ivory Coast. In 2021, its population was 146,537 and its seat is the settlement of Zoukougbeu. The sub-prefectures of the department are Domangbeu, Grégbeu, Guessabo, and Zoukougbeu.

History
Zoukougbeu Department was created in 2008 as a second-level subdivision via a split-off from Daloa Department. At its creation, it was part of Haut-Sassandra Region.

In 2011, districts were introduced as new first-level subdivisions of Ivory Coast. At the same time, regions were reorganised and became second-level subdivisions and all departments were converted into third-level subdivisions. At this time, Zoukougbeu Department remained part of the retained Haut-Sassandra Region in the new Sassandra-Marahoué District.

Notes

Departments of Haut-Sassandra
2008 establishments in Ivory Coast
States and territories established in 2008